In My Car may refer to:

 "In My Car" (The Beach Boys song)
 "In My Car" (Ringo Starr song)